Geoffrey Thomas Valli (born 3 November 1954) is a former New Zealand rugby union player. A full-back, Valli represented Southland and North Auckland at a provincial level. He played a single game for the New Zealand national side, the All Blacks, against Fiji in 1980, for which the New Zealand Rugby Union did not award full international caps.

Valli's brother, Keith, was killed in the Pike River Mine disaster in 2010.

References

1954 births
Living people
People from Nightcaps, New Zealand
New Zealand rugby union players
New Zealand international rugby union players
Southland rugby union players
Northland rugby union players
Rugby union fullbacks